The 2017–18 Chicago State Cougars women's basketball team represented Chicago State University in the 2017-18 NCAA Division I women's basketball season. They were led by fifteenth-year head coach Angela Jackson. The Cougars played their home games at the Emil and Patricia Jones Convocation Center, located in Chicago. They finished the season 1–29, 1–13 in WAC play to finish in last place. They lost in the quarterfinals of the WAC women's tournament to New Mexico State.

Following the end of the season, head coach Jackson was fired by the Chicago State Board of Trustees, along with men's head coach Tracy Dildy. A replacement has not yet been named.

Roster

Schedule

|-
!colspan=9 style=|Non-conference regular season

|-
!colspan=9 style=| WAC regular season

|-
!colspan=9 style=| WAC Women's Tournament

Schedule source:

See also
2017–18 Chicago State Cougars men's basketball team

References

Chicago State
Chicago State Cougars women's basketball seasons
Chicago State
Chicago State